Kozłów may refer to;

Places
Kozłów, Bolesławiec County in Lower Silesian Voivodeship (south-west Poland)
Kozłów, Wrocław County in Lower Silesian Voivodeship (south-west Poland)
Kozłów, Dąbrowa County in Lesser Poland Voivodeship (south Poland)
Kozłów, Miechów County in Lesser Poland Voivodeship (south Poland)
Kozłów, Subcarpathian Voivodeship (south-east Poland)
Kozłów, Świętokrzyskie Voivodeship (south-central Poland)
Kozłów, Gmina Radzanów in Masovian Voivodeship (east-central Poland)
Kozłów, Gmina Wyśmierzyce in Masovian Voivodeship (east-central Poland)
Kozłów, Garwolin County in Masovian Voivodeship (east-central Poland)
Kozłów, Radom County in Masovian Voivodeship (east-central Poland)
Kozłów, Silesian Voivodeship (south Poland)
Kozliv (formerly Kozłów), a town in Ternopil Oblast (western Ukraine)

People
Richard Kozlow (1926-2008), American artist